HMS L2 was a L-class submarine built for the Royal Navy during World War I.

Design and description
The L-class boats were enlarged and improved versions of the preceding E class. They displaced  on the surface and  submerged. The L-class submarines had a crew of 35 officers and ratings.

For surface running, the boats were powered by two 12-cylinder Vickers  diesel engines, each driving one propeller shaft. When submerged each propeller was driven by a  electric motor. They could reach  on the surface and  underwater.

The boats were armed with a total of six  torpedo tubes. Four of these were in the bow and the remaining pair in broadside mounts. They carried 10 reload torpedoes, all for the bow tubes. L2 was initially fitted with a  anti-aircraft gun, but this was later replaced by a  deck gun.

Construction and career
Originally laid down as E-class submarine E58 on 18 May 1916, she and sister ship  incorporated enough changes that they were renamed as the first pair of boats of a newly designated L class. L2 was launched 6 July 1917, and commissioned on 18 December 1917.

L2 survived an accidental attack by three American destroyers on 24 February 1918. The first heavy depth charge jammed the hydroplanes hard up. Four more heavy depth charges exploded shaking the boat. The skipper, Lieutenant-Commander Anworth, gave the order to blow the number 5 and 6 ballast tanks. One shot struck the pressure hull just abaft the conning tower. The crew waved white ensigns and fired rifles and the destroyers ceased fire. She survived the encounter.

L2 was assigned to the 4th Submarine Flotilla and HMS Titania in 1919 and sailed to Hong Kong, arriving on 14 April 1920, and was placed in the Reserve Flotilla in Hong Kong in 1923. She was sold in March 1930, and arrived in April at Thos. W. Ward, Grays, for break up.

Notes

References
 
 
 
 

 

British E-class submarines of the Royal Navy
British L-class submarines
Ships built in Barrow-in-Furness
1917 ships
World War I submarines of the United Kingdom
Royal Navy ship names